{{DISPLAYTITLE:C21H14O15}}
The molecular formula C21H14O15 (molar mass: 506.33 g/mol, exact mass: 506.03327 u) may refer to:

 Nonahydroxytriphenic acid
 Sanguisorbic acid
 Valoneic acid

Molecular formulas